The discography of Salyu consists of three studio albums, one compilations album, and 14 solo singles, four collaboration singles and one DVD. Out of her releases, her 2007 album Terminal is her most successful, being certified gold by the RIAJ.

Most of Salyu's music is written and produced by Takeshi Kobayashi, however occasionally other musicians write and compose for Salyu. Salyu has written the lyrics to 11 songs: "Birthday," "Cure the World," "Extension," "L.A.F.S.," , "I Believe," , "Liberty," "Sweet Pain,"  and "Whereabouts (For Anthony)." She wrote the music for "Cruise" and "L.A.F.S.," also producing the sound for "L.A.F.S."

Albums

Studio albums

Compilation album

Singles

As lead artist

As featured artist

DVDs

Other appearances

Notes

References 

Pop music discographies
Discographies of Japanese artists